West Benhar Football Club (also known simply as Benhar) were a senior football club from the small mining settlement of West Benhar, a mile to the south west of Harthill, Scotland. There is now little left of this settlement. Their home ground was situated in nearby Harthill, and the pitch still exists in the village today. It was reputed that they never lost a home game at Harthill Mains.

History 
They were formed in 1880 by Thomas "Baker" Brown  and for a short spell were a renowned cup team, playing in local competitions as well as the Scottish Cup

After a successful 1884/85 season where they reached the fifth round of the Scottish Cup, many of their players were tempted away to join other clubs and by the time they came to participate once again the following season, they couldn't raise a team for a match against Hamilton Academical F.C. and had to scratch, at the end of the 1885/86 season they were struck off the Scottish Football Association roll.

One of these players was Matt McQueen who resided in Harthill and worked at the Benhar Colliery. He joined Leith Athletic where he won two International caps for Scotland. He was eventually signed by Liverpool where after retiring as a player he became Manager and a Director of the club.

Reform 
However, what was left of the club reformed as West Benhar Violet as members of the Scottish Junior Football Association and were finalists in the Scottish Junior Cup in 1889 and 1892 before folding around the turn of the century.

Honours

Lanarkshire Cup

Winner: 1882–83
Runners-up: 1884–85

References

Defunct football clubs in Scotland
Football in North Lanarkshire